Pratapgarh District may refer to:
 Pratapgarh district, Rajasthan, India
 Pratapgarh district, Uttar Pradesh, India

District name disambiguation pages